Guangrao County is a county of Dongying City in north-central Shandong province, People's Republic of China. The southernmost county-level division of Dongying City, it lies halfway between the downtowns of Zibo and Dongying.

The population in 1999 was 470,198.

Administrative divisions
As 2012, this county is divided to 6 towns and 4 townships.
Towns

Townships

Climate

References 

Counties of Shandong
Dongying